Datuk Ir. Edmund Chong Ket Wah (Pha̍k-fa-sṳ: Chióng Koet-fà) (9 April 1956 – 9 October 2010), born in Sandakan, Sabah was a Malaysian politician. He was the Member of the Parliament of Malaysia for the Batu Sapi constituency in Sabah, representing the United Sabah Party (PBS) in the governing Barisan Nasional (BN) coalition until his sudden death. He also held the post of treasurer-general and the Elopura division chief in PBS.

Chong was first elected to Parliament by winning the seat of Batu Sapi, a new seat that was created following a re-delineation exercise and was first contested in 2004 election unopposed after his opponent withdrew. Before entering federal parliament, he served on the municipal council of Sandakan. In the 2008 election, he retained his seat by defeating independent candidate Chung Kwong Wing with an overwhelming 3708 majority by polling 9479 votes.

He was a qualified Mechanical Engineer and a Consultant Engineer by profession. He was also the Sabah Commercial Vehicles Licensing Board chairman. He died at the age of 54 in a road accident when his 750cc motorcycle collided with a car along the Sembulan-Tanjung Aru road in Kota Kinabalu, Sabah on 9 October 2010.

Election results 

Chong sudden demise had triggered the 2010 Batu Sapi by-election on 4 November 2010, the 13th by election after the 2008 Malaysian general election. His widow Datin Linda Tsen Thau Lin was chosen as BN candidate and successfully defended the seat he had held when he was alive.

Honours

Honours of Malaysia
  :
  Commander of the Order of Kinabalu (PGDK) - Datuk (2007)

See also 
 Politics of Malaysia

References 

1956 births
2010 deaths
People from Sabah
Malaysian politicians of Chinese descent
Malaysian people of Hakka descent
Malaysian Christians
Malaysian engineers
United Sabah Party politicians
Members of the Dewan Rakyat
Commanders of the Order of Kinabalu
Road incident deaths in Malaysia
Motorcycle road incident deaths